Helen Graham (DPhil, Oxford) is a Historian. She is Professor Emeritus of Modern European History at the Department of History, Royal Holloway University of London.

Overview 
Her research interests span the social and cultural history of 1930s and 1940s Spain, including the Spanish civil war; Europe in the inter-war period (1918–39); comparative civil wars; the social construction of state power in 1940s Spain; women under Francoism; comparative gender history.

Publications

References

External links 
http://pure.rhul.ac.uk/portal/en/persons/helen-graham_8fc507aa-5638-40be-ada7-b3865d4689b5.html

Living people
Academics of Royal Holloway, University of London
British historians
Historians of the Spanish Civil War
British women historians
Year of birth missing (living people)
Historians of the Second Spanish Republic